Ballandean railway station is located on the Southern line in Queensland, Australia. It services the town of Ballandean, a rural district in the Granite Belt.

Big Dinosaur

The station is a well-known landmark on the New England Highway due to the big dinosaur in front of it, nicknamed the Fruitisforus (Fruit-is-for-us). The dinosaur was originally constructed for a float in the 1998 Apple and Grape Festival. After the festival, the community placed it in front of the railway station to get passing traffic to stop and buy fruit for a community fundraiser. It proved so popular that it was reinforced with fibregrass and painted and made a permanent roadside feature.

References

External links
 

Ballandean, Queensland
Disused railway stations in Queensland
Southern railway line, Queensland